XHITA-FM is a radio station on 96.5 FM in Sonoyta, Sonora, serving Puerto Peñasco. The station is owned by Grupo Radiofónico ZER, is operated by Grupo Audiorama, and is known as La Bestia Grupera with a grupera format.

History
XHITA received its concession on November 10, 1988.

XHITA is owned by ZER and used to be known as La Tremenda. It is now operated by Audiorama and known as La Bestia Grupera.

References

Radio stations in Sonora
Radio stations established in 1988